Oles Semernya (2 August 1936 – 6 July 2012) was a Ukrainian artist, working mainly Ukraine and Moldova. He is one of the most prominent representatives of Ukrainian naive painting of the 20th century and the beginning of the 21st century. He made more than 600 paintings. Alexander F. Semernya member of the Union of Folk Art Masters of Ukraine and a member of the Moldovan and Ukrainian Charity Foundation of Professional Artists and Craftsmen "Renastere-Renaissance".

Philosophical views – "Cossack Mamay of Ukrainian art"
Oles Semernya – one of the most enigmatic creative figures of Ukraine. Oles becomes typical free Cossack, the defense of the Ukrainian people in one person. It is called a philosopher-recluse, because the artist lived in the countryside – and worked there, abandoning public life. This style of life, the artist explained that for him the whole world opens up when he is in front of the easel for which he created a bright and colorful work on the themes of national life. For their freedom-loving life picture of the implementation in the public manner Oles was nicknamed "Cossack Mamay of Ukrainian art."

Biography of events and creativity

Childhood
Oles Semernya born on 2 August 1936 in the village of  Berdyansk district of Zaporozhye region. Childhood in the Mariupol district. His mother – Maria Andrey Kasian, father – Fyodor Semernya. For the fact that my mother during the German occupation, worked as a nurse in a German hospital, Olesya with her mother and younger brother in the late 40s was sent to the city of Dzhezkazgan Karaganda region of Kazakhstan (near Baikonur). From here he went and came back here after a service in the Soviet Army (1954–1956).

The first work
Painted since childhood. After the army longing for Ukraine Semernyu leads to the city of Voznesensk, Mykolaiv Oblast. There he marries and starts drawing. Becomes a member of the creative association "Pribuzhie" where in 1970 held his first solo exhibition. In 1977 received the title of "Master of Folk Art." However, almost no one (including his wife – a medic with higher education) does not perceive it "wrong" drawing. Not finding support and understanding, Oles runs away from civilization "in the weeds" is a vagrant, further finds home in Kriva Pustosh, and later leaves Ukraine, as has neither own property nor the workshop.

Moldavian period, 1980s
For a long time Semernya lived and worked in Bălți (Moldova, then the Moldavian SSR), where it becomes a lot of pictures, of which – "Old Town", "Tarutine", "water carrier", "Altar". However, the artist does not break ties with Ukraine. The first exhibition was held in Nikolaev in the early 80s, which was organized by local art critic Valery Malina. Real discovery occurred after the exhibition of the artist at the Institute of Art History, Folklore and Ethnography of the Academy of Sciences (1982) and the Union of Writers of Ukraine (1983). Further, there were exhibitions in the library Medical Institute, where exposed and then Ivan Marchuk and others at the Institute of Semiconductors of Ukraine, with the active support of the chairman Paul Zagrebelniy (1983.1986), in the gallery of "Or" (head M. Volga), at the Museum of Folk Architecture and life of the Ukrainian SSR (1988). Publicized the exhibition in Kiev House of Trade Unions in 1990.

The film
1988 talented director-operator Leonid Anichkin created a unique film about the life and work of the artist "Charmed wheel of life" (A. Solopay cinematographer, screenwriter Lysenko, Anatoly Cherchenko composer Lazarus-Dikareva Tatiana State kinofotofonoarhiv number 11045), there – famous figures of Ukrainian culture have had their say about the work of Oles Semernya: Paul Zagrebelnyi, Yuri Pokalchuk, Ivan Malkovich, Valery Malina (discoverer of Semernya's talent), Nicholas Xherbak, Oksana Zabuzhko, Valentin Lysenko, Roxanne Gorbovets.

Kiev

In 1992 he carried out one of the most interesting collective presentation titled "Our roots and sources." Harmoniously united works of Vladimir Kabachenko (Odessa), Fyodor Panciuc (Vinnitsa), Olesya Semerni (Nikolaev – then he lived in Voznesensky) and Anatoly Furlet (Khmelnitsky). It was a strange quartet who sang Ukrainian folk song, so bright in color, informative on the basis of their national folklore and elegant for obrazotvoreniem. In 1994, a group of Kiev artists appealed to the Department of Culture of the Pechersk district administration with a proposal to turn the churchyard, one of the most beautiful streets of the Old Kiev, Street Art. Received support and examined the non-residential premises, which were extremely run, won the tender on a competitive basis and on its own to make repairs, design. In the result we set up "Cultural and artistic center for Kostyolna" –  7 art galleries and 8 creative workshops. With gallery "Gryphon" Oles Semernya starts cooperation, exposing his works there. The summer of 1996 Semernya's working participate in the I-st International Art Festival, which took place in the capital's Ukrainian House. Of 52 domestic and foreign galleries exhibition gallery "Griphon" with Semernya's works was nominated as the best and was awarded the Grand Prix. At the same time received an invitation from Harvard University to the exhibition in the United States. At Harvard flew colorful birds, who were born in independent Ukraine.  In 1996 works of maestro surprised Americans in Harvard, New York (Mission of Ukraine to the United Nations and at the Ukrainian Institute of America (the neighborhood on the prestigious Fifth Avenue Metropolitenmuzeem), Washington (Embassy of Ukraine in the USA), Philadelphia (in Ukrainian cultural center).

Cooperation with publishers

Starting from the 1990s, the artist collaborates with publishers. In 1991, the publishing of "Molod'" is working on a magazine for primary school age "Sunflower" – 1991, No. 2 . After becoming acquainted with Ivan Malkovich illustrates books for his publisher "A-BA-BA-HA-LA-MA-HA" – "Oh, you, cat Mark" (1993), "The Candle of the snow" .

Sokiryany

At the beginning of the third millennium Semernya returns to Ukraine and accidentally buys a house in Sokiryany in Bukovina. This painted and decorated with the artist's hands hut became a happy haven for ever restless artist. Artist acquainted with the artists Sokiryanschiny in particular Valentina Yarova, participates in regional exhibitions, in particular, to the Day of the artist, visited the regional center for children and youth. Created the work "The Brotherhood", "Christmas", "Birthday", "Welcome", "Cossack Song", "Santa Moldovans", "Harvest", "Mother's Song" ... In 2007, an exhibition at the Chernivtsi Regional Art Museum during which represented 31 of the work written in the last 20 years. In 2009 in Chisinau held a solo artist exhibition "Paleta Ucraineană a Moldovei – Ukrainian palette of Moldova" dedicated to the 15th anniversary of the Foundation of the Moldovіan Ukrainian of Professional Artists and Craftsmen "Renaştere-Renaissance".

Review of publications

Regularly published in the press review of the artist's work.

2003 magazine "Ukrainian Culture" published articles Ivan Malkovich "Cossack Mamai of Ukrainian painting"  and Anatoly Bruce "The thrill of the soul"

2006 to about 70th anniversary of the artist published an article by A. Yaremchuk "With net praistokov"

In 2007, JF Kitsul for Chernivtsi Art Museum organizes booklet "Semernya Oles F." for the exhibition of works by the artist.

2008 journal "Museum Lane" publishes a review of Nina Petrusovoi "Sokiryany Bukovina: Oles Semernya" .

2011 Online Kamenetz-Podolsk National University named after Ivan Ogienko published a senior scientific researcher of the Institute of Cultural Heritage of the Academy of Sciences of Moldova V. Rokachuk article "ALEXANDER Semernya"

Last years of life

The artist detect a cancer, which he fought bravely. Coming to Kiev (or from Moldova, from Bukovina), it certainly feeds the soul of Ivan Gonchar's Museum, in the Kiev-Pechersk Lavra. The latest solo exhibition of his work took place in the summer of 2011 in Kiev gallery "Gryphon". For admirers of his talent it was a holiday, because meter recently operated, and the disease does not retreating. He worked as an artist until his death in his hut in the Bessarabian Sokiryany.

Artist's Words in eternity

"	
DIALOGUE WITH LOVE

The world is infinite ...

This is sphere, every point of which is its center, where I would not go, I do not go beyond its geometric size. I always stay in place, in the center. But I'm getting old. Why?

We can assume that I'm moving, not in space, but only just in time. Transitional corridor so narrow! Do not overtake, not to lag behind, just went through stops moving. When I stop moving, stepping over me ... Holt is not – there are only fellow travelers!

And yet there are trucks to move in space! This is – a thought! Its sender is me, sadly wandering temporary corridor, leaving on its walls the traces of its fragile, coming in all the big useless shell. I'm fabulously rich! My condition is you. You – my Love!

I've never seen you, but I know exactly where you are. You – in the center!

When I speak to you, you hear me!

If it is not, then it's not you.

When you turn to me, I hear you!

If it is not, then it's not me.

– I love you!

– That's Me!

– Do you love me?

– That's Me!

– I do not know you ...

– It's not me!

– I do not see you ...

– Do you feel me!

– How do you know?

– It's You!

– And if I'm gone?

– You will be always.

– But I'm sick?

– You can not hurt, can only hurt your shell.

– But, I'm in it?

– The shells of many, infinite in number, and you all at the same time!

– But where are they, how do you find them?

– They and center!

– They can be seen?

– They can feel ...

– I love you!

– Do you feel!

– Do you love me?

– I feel!

Moses

"

Tomb of the artist

Over the grave of Olesya Semerni eternal memory is a cross, made by his own sketches.

Creative heritage

After his death, a powerful part of his paintings (70), will be the subject of a wide enjoyment of the human community. Oles Semernya's works are in private collections from 26 countries, in particular Paul Zahrebelnyi, Oles Gonchar, Dmitry Pavlychko, Ivan Malkovich, Nicholas Volga and other prominent figures of Ukrainian culture and museums: the National Art Museum of Ukraine, Ukrainian Folk Art Museum, the Museum of Folk Life and Architecture (Pirohovo, Kiev) and many others. Bukovina Society of the city, now founded a Sokiryany museum of Oles Semernya in the house where he lived and worked as an artist.

Own estimate

Here's how he Oles Semernya says about his own work:

"	
"I live in a small house, without TV, computer. I have the oven, cook where he is, well. The sun does not hide, so this tan – laughing artist. – Topics for the works taken out of life. Faces of my heroes in the pictures look like mine. Probably, all the artists have maintained that the paint in the first place itself. "

"
"	
My dear friends gold! I am happy that you got me so high value. I will try to stay in the same capacity to not disappoint you and will continue tirelessly to create their masterpieces, that they bring you joy. Embrace. Sincerely Yours Oles Semernya of Burian "Turkish valley."

Photos of life

References

Ukrainian artists
1936 births
2012 deaths
People from Zaporizhzhia Oblast